Ilderjin (also Romanized as Īlderjīn, Īldarchīn, Ildarjin, and Ildrajīn; also known as Andarjīn, Enderajīn, Enderjīn, and Indrājīn) is a village in Kharaqan-e Sharqi Rural District, Abgarm District, Avaj County, Qazvin Province, Iran. At the 2006 census, its population was 159, in 54 families.

References 

Populated places in Avaj County